Aramis Haywood (born 3 April 1985) is a Panamanian football midfielder who currently plays for El Farolito Soccer Club in the National Premier Soccer League.

Club career
He played for several Panamanian club sides and joined Sporting San Miguelito in January 2012. He was released by Sporting in summer 2015.

International career
Haywood made his debut for Panama in an October 2010 friendly match against Cuba and has earned a total of 5 caps, scoring 1 goal. He represented his country at the 2011 Copa Centroamericana and the 2011 CONCACAF Gold Cup. Haywood scored his only goal with the national team in his second appearance, a 2–0 victory against Honduras in November 2010.

International goals
Scores and results list Panama's goal tally first.

References

External links

 Profile - Sporting SM

1985 births
Living people
Sportspeople from Panama City
Association football midfielders
Panamanian footballers
Panama international footballers
2011 Copa Centroamericana players
2011 CONCACAF Gold Cup players
Unión Deportivo Universitario players
Atlético Veragüense players
C.D. Plaza Amador players
Sporting San Miguelito players
Alianza F.C. footballers
El Farolito Soccer Club players